Associação Desportiva do Fundão  is a sports club based in the city of Fundão, Portugal. The futsal team of Fundão plays in the Portuguese Futsal First Division and won the 2013-14 Portuguese Futsal Cup beating SL Benfica 7–6 in extra time. The club formerly fielded a football team whose highest success was a 13th place in the fourth tier Terceira Divisão during the 1985–86 season.

Futsal

Current squad

Football

League and cup history

References

External links
 Official website
 Zerozero

Futsal clubs in Portugal
Association football clubs established in 1955
1955 establishments in Portugal